Lake Missaukee is a freshwater lake located in Missaukee County in the U.S. state of Michigan. The lake is mostly surrounded by Lake Township, while bordering Lake City to the east and a very small portion extending north into Caldwell Township.

Geology
Lake Missaukee is classified as a glacial lake, and it has its origins about 11,000 years ago at the end of the Last Glacial Period.

It is the largest lake in Missaukee County and is considered part of the Muskegon River watershed. Because Lake Missaukee sits at a relatively high elevation, the lake has a very small watershed of only , which is smaller than the lake itself. The lake has no primary outflow, but water levels are controlled with drainage into the small Mosquito Creek. The creek eventually flows into the Clam River, which leads into the Muskegon River to Lake Michigan.

Activities
The shores of the lake were first inhabited by European settlers as early as the late 1860s, and logging was a prominent industry until the early 1900s. The lake was used to float logs to the numerous sawmills and other factories surrounding the lake. None of these industries presently exist along the lake, although debris remnants of the past logging industry can still be found in the lake.

Lake Missaukee is easily accessible, with the city of Lake City to the east. M-55/M-66 runs along the eastern coastline through Lake City. The larger city of Cadillac is located 15 minutes west.

The lake serves as a recreational area for fishing, swimming, and boating, and there are numerous parks and beaches surrounding the lake. There are several public access boat launches, including one maintained by the Michigan Department of Natural Resources at the northern end of the lake at Missaukee County Park.

Fishing
Popular among fishermen, common fish include bluegill, black crappie, brown bullhead, large and smallmouth bass, pumpkinseed, northern pike, walleye, and yellow perch. There are also rare sightings of common carp. The Michigan Department of Natural Resources stocks walleye in the lake, and the numerous fish populations are routinely monitored. Invasive species within the lake include Eurasian milfoil and zebra mussels.

References

Missaukee
Bodies of water of Missaukee County, Michigan
Tourist attractions in Missaukee County, Michigan